Nikolay Antonovich Paskutsky (1894 – July 28, 1938) was a Soviet politician who served briefly as the third first secretary of the Communist Party of the Turkmen SSR, serving from 1927 until August 1928. He was shot on 28 July 1938 during the Great Purge.

References
World Statesmen

1894 births
1938 deaths
People from Kamianets-Podilskyi
People from Kamenets-Podolsky Uyezd
Party leaders of the Soviet Union
Communist Party of Turkmenistan politicians
Russian military personnel of World War I
Ukrainian people of World War I
Recipients of the Order of the Red Banner
Great Purge victims from Ukraine
People executed by the Soviet Union by firearm